Lakeland Bus Lines, Inc is a privately chartered and apportioned bus company headquartered in Dover, New Jersey. Lakeland operates commuter routes from Morris, Sussex, Somerset and Essex Counties, NJ to New York City.

Routes
Lakeland Bus Lines provides service along three routes, each named for the corridor on which it travels.

Commuter routes

Casino Line Service 
Lakeland Bus Lines provides service along routes for day or overnight trips to Atlantic City Casinos, Mount Airy Casino Resort in Mount Pocono, Pennsylvania, and Wind Creek Bethlehem in Bethlehem, Pennsylvania.

References

External links 
Lakeland Bus Lines website
Fan Page

Surface transportation in Greater New York
Transport companies established in 1952
Bus transportation in New Jersey
Companies based in Morris County, New Jersey
1952 establishments in New Jersey
American companies established in 1952